This is a bibliography of literary and historical works about cricket.  The list is sorted by author's name. It is inevitably highly selective. The 1984 edition of E. W. Padwick's A Bibliography of Cricket (see below) had more than 10,000 entries.

A
David Rayvern Allen
 Arlott on Cricket (1984) (editor)
 Cricket on the Air (1985) (editor)
 Early Books on Cricket (1987)

HS Altham
 MCC Cricket Coaching Book, 1st edition (1952)
 Hampshire County Cricket: The official history of Hampshire County Cricket Club (1957)
 A History of Cricket (with E W Swanton) – various editions, most recently 1962 (hb), 1968 (pb)
 Lord's and the MCC (with John Arlott) (1967)
 The Heart of Cricket: A memoir of H.S. Altham (1967)

John Arlott
 Indian Summer (1946)
 Gone to the Cricket (1948)
 How to Watch Cricket (1948; rev 1983)
 From Hambledon to Lords (1948)
 Concerning Cricket (1949)
 The Middle Ages of Cricket (1949)
 Gone with the Cricketers (1950)
 Cricket in the Counties (1950)
 Days at the Cricket (1951)
 Maurice Tate (1951)
 The Echoing Green (1952)
 Test Match Diary 1953 (1953)
  Australian Test Journal 1954-55 (1955)
 Alletson's Innings (1957)
 Cricket Journal (1958)
 Cricket Journal 2 (1959)
 Cricket Journal 3 : Cricket on Trial (1960)
 Cricket Journal 4 : The Australian Challenge (1961)
 Vintage Summer 1967 (1967)
 Cricket – The Great Ones : Eight First Class Batsmen (1967)
 Cricket – The Great Bowlers (1968)
 The Noblest Game: A Book of Fine Cricket Prints (with Neville Cardus) (1969)
 Cricket – The Great All-rounders (1970)
 Cricket – The Great Captains (1971)
 Fred – Portrait of a Fast Bowler (1971)
 The Ashes 1972 (1972)
 A Hundred Years of County Cricket (1973)
 An Eye for Cricket (with Patrick Eagar) (1979)
 John Arlott's Book of Cricketers (1979)
 Jack Hobbs : Profile of the Master (1981)
 A Word from Arlott (1983)
 Arlott on Cricket (1984) (edited by David Rayvern Allen)
 John Arlott's 100 Greatest Batsmen (1986)
 The Essential John Arlott (1989)
 Basingstoke Boy : The Autobiography (1989)

Geoff Armstrong
 A Century of Summers: 100 years of Sheffield Shield cricket, Randwick, Ironbark Press, 1992.

F S Ashley-Cooper
 At the Sign of the Wicket (1900) – a series in Cricket Magazine reproducing notices of known matches played 1742 to 1751
 Sussex Cricket and Cricketers (1901)
 Curiosities of First-Class Cricket 1730-1901 (1901)
 The Hambledon Cricket Chronicle 1772-1796 (1924)
 Kent Cricket Matches 1719-1880 (1929)

Association of Cricket Statisticians and Historians
 A Guide to Important Cricket Matches Played in the British Isles 1707-1863 (1985)
 A Guide to First-Class Cricket Matches Played in the British Isles (2nd ed 1982)
 A Guide to First-Class Cricket Matches Played in Australia (2nd ed 1983)
 A Guide to First-Class Cricket Matches Played in India (1986)
 A Guide to First-Class Cricket Matches Played in New Zealand (1981)
 A Guide to First-Class Cricket Matches Played in North and South America (1987)
 A Guide to First-Class Cricket Matches Played in Pakistan (1989)
 A Guide to Important Cricket Matches Played in South Africa (1981)
 A Guide to First-Class Cricket Matches Played in Sri Lanka (1987)
 A Guide to First-Class Cricket Matches Played in the West Indies (1984)
 The ACS International Cricket Yearbook (2013 edition is the 28th year)
 The ACS Second Eleven Annual (2013 edition is the 29th year)
 The Cricket Statistician, a quarterly Journal for members
 The ACS Famous Cricketers Series (complete playing records, match by match, of notable cricketers, 100 were published in the series).

B
Philip Bailey
 Who's Who of Cricketers (co-edited) (1984, second edition 1993)

Trevor Bailey
 The Greatest of My Time (1968)

Anthony Barker
 The WACA: An Australian Cricket Success Story (1998)

Ralph Barker
 Ten Great Innings (1964)
 Ten Great Bowlers (1967)
 England v Australia: A compendium of Test cricket between the countries 1877-1968 (with Irving Rosenwater) (1969)
 Cricketing Family Edrich (1976)
 Innings of a Lifetime, 1954-77 (1982)
 Purple Patches (1987)

Brian Bassano
 South Africa in International Cricket 1888–1970 (1979)
 The West Indies in Australia 1930-31 (with Rick Smith) (1990)
 A Springbok Down Under: South Africa on Tour, 1931-32 (with Rick Smith) (1991) (based on the diary of Ken Viljoen)
 Vic's Boys: Australia in South Africa 1935-36 (1993)
 South African Cricket: Vol. 4, 1947–1960 (1996)
 South Africa versus England: 106 Years of Test Match Glory (1996)
 MCC in South Africa 1938-39 (1997)
 Aubrey Faulkner: His Record Innings by Innings (2001)
 Mann's Men: MCC in South Africa 1922-23 (2004)
 The Visit of Mr W. W. Read's 1891-92 English Cricket Team to South Africa (with Rick Smith) (2007)
 Maiden Victory: The 1935 South African Tour of England (with Rick Smith) (2012)

Richie Benaud
 The Way of Cricket (1961)
 A Tale of Two Tests (1962)
 Spin Me a Spinner (1963)
 The New Champions (1966)
 Willow Patterns (1969)
 Test Cricket (1982)
 World Series Cup Cricket 1981-82 (1982)
 The Hottest Summer (1983)
 The Ashes 1982-83 (1983)
 Benaud on Reflection (1984)
 The Appeal of Cricket (1995)
 Anything But (1998)
 My Spin on Cricket (2005)
 Over But Not Out (2010)

Henry Bentley
 A Correct Account of all the Cricket Matches which have been played by the Mary-le-bone Club, and all other principal matches, from the Year 1786 to 1822 inclusive (1823)

Keith Booth
 Atherton's progress: From Kensington Oval to Kennington Oval (1996)
 Knowing the Score (1998) (a history of scoring)
 His Own Enemy (2000) (biography of Ted Pooley)
 The Father of Modern Sport: The Life and Times of Charles W. Alcock (2002)
 George Lohmann, Pioneer Professional (2007)
 Ernest Hayes – Brass in a Golden Age (2009)

Rowland Bowen
 Cricket: A History of its Growth and Development throughout the World (1970)

Derek Birley
 A Social History of English Cricket (1999)
 The Willow Wand: Some Cricket Myths Explored (1979)

Sir Don Bradman
 The Art of Cricket. Hodder & Stoughton. (1958)  (1998 re-issue).
 The Story of My Cricketing Life with hints on Batting, Bowling, Fielding in the Cricketer Annual (1930)
 Farewell to Cricket (1949)

Mike Brearley
 The Art of Captaincy (1985)

Samuel Britcher
 A list of all the principal Matches of Cricket that have been played in the year x (annual series where x = 1790 to 1800)

Dick BrittendenGreat Days in New Zealand Cricket (1958)New Zealand Cricketers (1961)The Finest Years: Twenty Years of New Zealand Cricket (1977) A.H. & A.W. Reed Ltd, 

Gerald Brodribb
 Next Man In : A survey of cricket laws and customs (1953, 1985, 1996)
 Hit for Six (1960)
 Felix on the Bat: Being a Memoir of Nicholas Felix (1962). (NB: See also Nicholas Wanostrocht: Felix on the Bat (1845)
 The Croucher: A Biography of Gilbert Jessop (1974)
 Maurice Tate: a biography (1977)
 The Lost Art (1997) (A history of underarm bowling)

G B Buckley
 Fresh Light on Eighteenth Century Cricket (1935)
 Fresh Light on Pre-Victorian Cricket (1937)

Alexander Buzo
 Legends of the Baggy Green (2004)

C
Sir Neville Cardus
 A Cricketer's Book (1922)
 Days in the Sun (1924)
 Good Days (1934)
 Australian Summer (1937)
 Autobiography (1947)
 Second Innings (1950)
 Cricket All The Year (1952)
 Close of Play (1956)
 The Playfair Cardus (1963)
 The Noblest Game: A Book of Fine Cricket Prints (with John Arlott) (1969)
 Full Score (1970)
 Cardus on Cricket (1977)
 Cardus in the Covers (1978)
 Play Resumed With Cardus (1979)
 A Fourth Innings with Cardus (1981)
 The Roses Matches 1919-1939 (1982)
 A Cardus for All Seasons (1985)
 Cardus on the Ashes (1989)
 The Wisden Papers of Neville Cardus (Wisden Papers) (1989) (edited by Benny Green)

Dudley CarewEngland Over, A Cricket Book (1927)Son of Grief (novel; 1936)To The Wicket (1947)

Arthur Carman
 Cricket Almanack of New Zealand New Zealand International Cricket 1894-1974Richard Cashman
 Patrons, Players and the Crowd : The Phenomenon of Indian cricket (1980)
 '''Ave a go, yer mug !  Australian Cricket Crowds from Larrikin to Ocker (1984)
 The "Demon" Spofforth (1990)

Stephen Chalke
 Runs in the Memory (1997)
 Caught in the Memory: County Cricket in the 1960s (1999)
 One More Run (2000) (with Bryan "Bomber" Wells)
 At the Heart of English Cricket: The Life and Memories of Geoffrey Howard (2001) (with Geoffrey Howard)
 Guess My Story: The Life and Opinions of Keith Andrew, Cricketer (2003) 
 No Coward Soul: The Remarkable Story of Bob Appleyard (2003) (with Derek Hodgson)
 Ken Taylor: Drawn to Sport (2006)
 A Summer of Plenty: George Herbert Hirst in the Summer of 1906 (2006)
 Tom Cartwright: The Flame Still Burns (2007)
 Five Five Five: Holmes and Sutcliffe in 1932 (2007)
 The Way It Was: Glimpses of English Cricket's Past (2008)
 Now I'm 62: The Diary of an Ageing Cricketer (a novel) (2010)
 A Long Half Hour: Six Cricketers Remembered (2010)
 Micky Stewart and the Changing Face of Cricket (2012)
 Gentlemen, Gypsies and Jesters: The Wonderful World of Wandering Cricket (2013) (with Anthony Gibson)

Aakash Chopra
 Beyond the Blues: A First-Class Season Like No Other (2009)
 Out of the Blue: Rajasthan's Road to the Ranji Trophy (2011)

"A Country Vicar"
 Cricket Memories (1930)
 Second Innings (1933)
 The Happy Cricketer (1946)

Tony Cozier
 The West Indies: 50 Years of Test Cricket (1978 – foreword by Sir Garfield Sobers)

D
Bernard Darwin
 Eton v Harrow at Lord's (1926)
 W. G. Grace (1934)

James Dance (a.k.a. James Love)
 Cricket, an Heroic Poem (1744)

William Denison
 Cricket
 Sketches of the Players (1846)

E
W Epps
 A Collection of all the Grand Matches of Cricket 1771 to 1791 (1799)

F
Nicholas Felix (Nicholas Wanostrocht)
 Felix on the Bat (1845)

Jack Fingleton
 Cricket Crisis (1947)
 Brightly Fades the Don (1949)
 Brown & Company (1951)
 The Ashes Crown the Year (1954)
 Masters of Cricket (1958)
 Four Chukkas to Australia (1960)
 The Greatest Test of All (1961)
 Fingleton on Cricket, London, Collins, 1972.
 The Immortal Victor Trumper (1978)
 Batting from Memory (1981)

John Ford
 Cricket – A Social History 1700-1835 (1972)

Bill Frindall
 The Wisden Book of Test Cricket 1877-1978 (1979)

David Frith
 The Fast Men (1975)
 My Dear Victorious Stod (1977)
 The Golden Age of Cricket (1978)
 The Slow Men (1984)
 Archie Jackson (1987)
 Pageant of Cricket (1987)
 Silence of the Heart (1991)
 Bodyline Autopsy (2002)

G
A J Gaston
 Sussex County Cricket 1728-1923 (1924)

Alan Gibson
 Jackson's Year: The Test Matches of 1905 (1966)
 Growing Up With Cricket – Some Memories of a Sporting Education (1985)
 The Cricket Captains of England (1979, revised edition 1989)
 Of Didcot and the Demon: The Cricketing Times of Alan Gibson (2009) (Compiled by Anthony Gibson)

William Godfrey – pseudonym of Samuel Youd for his novels about cricket

William Goldwin
 In Certamen Pilae ('On a ball game': i.e., a rural cricket match) (1706)

John Goulstone
 Hambledon – The Men and the Myths (2001)

W G Grace
 Cricket (1891)
 Cricketing Reminiscences and Personal Recollections (1899)

Peter Griffiths
 Padwick's Bibliography of Cricket, Volume 2, Compiled by Stephen Eley and Peter Griffiths, Library Association, 1991 (covers the period 1980–1990)

Ramachandra Guha
 Wickets in the East (1992)
 Spin and Other Turns (1994)
 An Indian Cricket Omnibus (ed. with TG Vaidyanathan) (1994)
 The Picador Book of Cricket (ed.) (2001)
 A Corner of a Foreign Field – An Indian History of a British sport (2002)
 The States of Indian Cricket (2005)

H
Gideon Haigh
 The Cricket War (1993). 
 Mystery Spinner: The story of Jack Iverson, Melbourne, Text, 1999.
 The Big Ship: Warwick Armstrong and the Making of Modern Cricket  (2000)
 Game for Anything: Writings on Cricket  (2004)
 Silent Revolutions: Writings on Cricket History  (2006)
 The Green & Golden Age: Writings on Cricket  (2007)
 
Duncan Hamilton
 Harold Larwood (2009)

Chris Harte
 A History of Australian Cricket (1993)
 The History of the Sheffield Shield (1987)

Fyzul Hassanali
 Captaincy in Cricket (2002) 
 Captain out, All Out (2004)

Arthur Haygarth
 Frederick Lillywhite's Cricket Scores and Biographies, published in 15 volumes between 1862 and 1879

Bernard Hollowood
 Cricket on the Brain (1970)

Gerald Howat
 Learie Constantine (1975)
 Village Cricket (1980),
 Cricketer Militant: the life of Jack Parsons (1980)
 Walter Hammond (1984)
 Plum Warner (1987)
 Len Hutton: The Biography (1988)
 Cricket's Second Golden Age: The Hammond-Bradman Years (1989)
 Cricket Medley (1993)
 Cricket All My Life (autobiography) (2006)

J
C L R James
 Beyond a Boundary (1963)

D R Jardine
 In Quest of the Ashes (1933)

K
JM Kilburn
In Search of Cricket (1937)
The Scarborough Cricket Festival (1948)
History of Yorkshire County Cricket 1924-1949 (1950)
Yorkshire County Cricket (County Cricket Series) (1950)
Len Hutton: The story of a great cricketer (1951)
Cricket (Homes of Sport) (with Norman Yardley) (1952)
Cricket Decade: England v. Australia 1946 to 1956 (1959)
A Century of Yorkshire County Cricket (1963)
A History of Yorkshire Cricket (1970)
Thanks to Cricket (1973)
Overthrows (1975)
Sweet Summers: The Classic Cricket Writing of JM Kilburn: Edited by Duncan Hamilton (2008)

A E Knight
 The Complete Cricketer (1906)

L
John Lazenby
 Test of Time, John Murray, 2005

Christopher Lee
 From the Sea End – Official History of Sussex CCC (1989)

David Lemmon
 The History of Surrey County Cricket Club (1989)

W J Lewis
 The Language of Cricket (1938)

E V Lucas
 The Hambledon Men (1907)

M
Timothy J McCann
 Sussex Cricket in the Eighteenth Century (2004)

John Major
 More Than a Game: The Story of Cricket's Early Years (2007: HarperCollins)

Ashley Mallett
 Trumper: the illustrated biography, Melbourne, Macmillan, 1985.

John Marshall
 A History of Sussex Cricket (1959)
 The Duke Who Was Cricket (1961)

G D Martineau
 Bat, Ball, Wicket and All (1954)
 The Field is Full of Shades (1954)
 They Made Cricket (1956)

Christopher Martin-Jenkins
 The Wisden Book of County Cricket (with Frank Warwick) (1981)
 Ball by Ball: The Story of Cricket Broadcasting (1990)

Ronald Mason
 Batsman's Paradise: An anatomy of cricketomania (1955)
 Jack Hobbs – A Portrait of an Artist as a Great Batsman (1960)
 Walter Hammond: A biography (1962)
 Sing All A Green Willow (1967)
 'Plum' Warner's Last Season (1970)
 Warwick Armstrong's Australians (1973)
 Ashes in the Mouth: The Story of the Bodyline Tour of 1932-33 (1982)

Eric Midwinter
 WG Grace: His Life and Times (1981)
 150 Years: Surrey Cricket Club 1845-1995 (1995)

Keith Miller
 Cricket Crossfire (1956)

Mary Russell Mitford
 Our Village (1832) (this collection of essays contains one on a village cricket match)

 Geoffrey Moorhouse
 The Best Loved Game (1979)

Mahiyar Morawalla
 Cricket Cavalcade: Studies of Great Batsmen (1976)
 King of Kings: The Story of Sir Garfield Sobers (1981)

Patrick Morrah
 Alfred Mynn and the Cricketers of his Time (1986)

Ashley Mote
 The Glory Days of Cricket (1997)
 John Nyren's "The Cricketers of My Time" (1998)

Johnnie Moyes
 Australian Cricket: A History, Sydney, Angus & Robertson, 1959.

Sujit Mukherjee
The Romance of Indian Cricket 1968
Playing for India 1972
Between Indian Wickets 1977
Matched Winners 1996
Autobiography of an Unknown Cricketer 1997
An Indian Cricket Century: Selected Writings 2002

D.J. Mulvaney
Cricket Walkabout: The Australian Aboriginal Cricketers on Tour 1867-8 (1967)

N
William North
 Nottingham Old Club Match Scores (1832)

John Nyren
 The Young Cricketer's Tutor and the Cricketers of My Time (with Charles Cowden Clarke)(1833)

P
 E.W. Padwick
 A Bibliography of Cricket, Library Association, 1984 (2nd edition)
 Padwick's Bibliography of Cricket, Volume 2, Compiled by Stephen Eley and Peter Griffiths, Library Association, 1991 (covers the period 1980–1990)

J S Penny
 Cricket References in Norwich Newspapers 1701 – 1800 (year tbc)

Roland Perry
 The Don, Sydney, Pan Macmillan, 1995.

Playfair
 Playfair Cricket Annual (annually from 1948)

Jack Pollard
 Australian Cricket 5 volumes: The Formative Years, 1803–1893; The Turbulent Years, 1893–1917; The Bradman Years 1918–1948; The Packer Years, 1948–1995; Highest, Most and Best, 192 Years of Cricket Statistics. Sydney, The Book Company, 1995.
 Australian Cricket: The game and the players. Sydney, Hodder & Stoughton, 1982.
 Six and Out: The legend of Australian and New Zealand Cricket, 4th ed., North Sydney, Jack Pollard, 1973

James Pycroft
 The Cricket Field (1851)

R
Simon Rae
 W.G. Grace: A Life (1998)

Vasant Raiji
 Ranji: The Legend and the Man (1963)
 L. P. Jai: Memories of a Great Batsman (edited) (1976)
 The Romance of the Ranji Trophy (1984)
 India's Hambledon Men (1986)
 CCI and the Brabourne Stadium, 1937-1987 (with Anandji Dossa) (1987)
 C. K. Nayudu: The Shahenshah of Indian Cricket (1989)
 Duleep: A Centenary Tribute (2005)
 From Presidency to Pentangular (with Mohandas Menon) (2006)

Netta Rheinberg
 Fair Play – the story of women's cricket (1976) – (with Rachael Heyhoe-Flint)

R. C. Robertson-Glasgow
 Cricket Prints – Some Batsmen and Bowlers (1920–1940) (1943)
 More Cricket Prints – Some Batsmen and Bowlers (1920–1945) (1948)
 46 Not Out – an autobiography (1948)
 Rain Stopped Play (1948)
 The Brighter Side of Cricket (1950)
 All in the Game (1952)
 How To Become A Test Cricketer (1962)
 Crusoe on cricket: The cricket writings of R.C. Robertson-Glasgow (1966)

Ray Robinson
 Between Wickets (1946)
 The Glad Season (1955)
 The Wildest Tests (1972)
 On Top Down Under (1975)

Peter Roebuck
 Slices of Cricket Unwin, (1982) , 
 It Never Rains: A Cricketer's Lot, Unwin, (1984) ; ;
 It Sort of Clicks, (with Ian Botham) (1986) , 
 Great Innings, Blitz (1990) , 
 Tangled Up in White: Peter Roebuck on Cricket, Hodder & Stoughton, (1992) , 
 From Sammy to Jimmy: History of Somerset County Cricket Club, Partridge Press (1991) , 
 Sometimes I Forgot to Laugh, (autobiography) Allen & Unwin (2004)   
 It Takes All Sorts: Celebrating Cricket's Colourful Characters, Allen & Unwin, (2005) 
 In It To Win It: The Australian Cricket Supremacy Allen & Unwin, (2006) 

Alan Ross
 Australia 55 (1955)
 Cape Summer and the Australians in England (1956)
 The Cricketer's Companion (editor) (1960)
 Through the Caribbean (1960)
 Australia 63 (1963)
 Ranji – Prince of Cricketers (1983)

Rowland Ryder
 Cricket Calling (1995)

S
Keith A. P. Sandiford
 100 Years of Organised Cricket in Barbados, 1892–1992 (1992; edited with Ronald Hughes and Carlisle Burton)
 Cricket Nurseries of Colonial Barbados: The Elite Schools, 1865–1966 (1998)
 Gary Sobers (1998)
 The Imperial Game: Cricket, Culture and Society (1998; edited with Brian Stoddart)

Hugh de Sélincourt
 The Cricket Match (a novel) (1924)

Gerard Siggins
 Green Days: Cricket in Ireland 1792-2005 (2005)
 100 Greats of Irish Cricket (with James Fitzgerald, 2006)
 Raiders of the Caribbean: Ireland's World Cup adventure (with Trent Johnston, 2007)

HF & AP Squire
 Pre-Victorian Sussex Cricket (1951)

Richard Streeton
 PGH Fender: A Biography (1981)

JF Sutton
 Nottingham Cricket Matches from 1771 to 1853, Simpkin & Marshall, 1853

E W Swanton
 Elusive Victory (1951)
 Cricket and the Clock (1952)
 Best Cricket Stories (1953)
 West Indian Adventure 1953-1954 (1954)
 West Indies Revisited – MCC tour 1959-1960 (1960)
 Cricket from All Angles (1968)
 Sort of a Cricket Person (1972)
 Swanton in Australia with MCC 1946-1975 (1975)
 Follow On (1977)
 Barclays World of Cricket (General Editor) (1980 – 2nd ed.)
 As I Said at the Time – a Lifetime of Cricket (1983)
 Gubby Allen – Man of Cricket (1985)
 Kent Cricket – a Photographic History 1744-1984 (with C H Taylor) (1985)
 The Essential E W Swanton – the 1980s Observed (1990)
 Last Over – A Life in Cricket (1996)

T
Percy Francis Thomas
 Old English Cricket (1929)

A. A. Thomson
 Cricket My Pleasure (1953)
 Cricket My Happiness (1954)
 Pavilioned in Splendour (1956)
 The Great Cricketer (a biography of Dr W G Grace) (1957 and 1968)
 Odd Men In (1958)
 Hirst and Rhodes (1959, 1986)
 Cricket Bouquet (1961)
 Cricket: The Golden Ages (1961)
 Hutton and Washbrook (1963)
 Cricket: The Great Captains (1965)
 Cricket: The Wars of the Roses (1967)
 Cricketers of My Times (1967)

Geoff Tibballs
 No-balls and Googlies (2007)

U
David Underdown
 Start of Play (2000)

W
H T Waghorn
 Cricket Scores 1730–1773 (1899)
 The Dawn of Cricket (1906)

P F Warner
 How we recovered the Ashes (1904)
 Cricket Between Two Wars (1942)
 Lord's 1787-1945 (1947)
 Long Innings (1951)
 Sir Pelham Warner's Book of Cricket (1945)

Steve Waugh
 Out of My Comfort Zone: the autobiography, Melbourne, Penguin, 2005.

J R Webber
 The Chronicle of W.G. (1998)

Roy Webber
 The Playfair Book of Cricket Records, Playfair Books, 1951
 The Australians in England: A record of the 21 Australian cricket tours of England, 1878 to 1953 (1953)
 The County Cricket Championship: A history of the competition from 1873 to the present day (1957)
 Phoenix History of Cricket (1960)
 The Book of Cricket Records, Playfair Books, 1963 (concise edition)

Simon Wilde
 Ranji: A Genius Rich and Strange (1990)
 Letting Rip: The Fast Bowling Threat from Lillee to Waqar (1994)
 Number One: The World's Best Batsmen and Bowlers (1998)
 Caught: The Full Story of Corruption in International Cricket (2001)
 Shane Warne: Portrait of a Flawed Genius (2007)

Martin Wilson
 An Index to Waghorn (Bodyline Books, 2005)

John Wisden
 Wisden Cricketers' Almanack (annually from 1864)
 Wisden Cricketers' Almanack Australia
 The Wisden Cricketer – a monthly magazine
 Wisden Cricket Monthly – merged with The Cricketer to form The Wisden Cricketer
 Wisden Asia Cricket – (defunct)

John Woodcock
 The Times – One Hundred Greatest Cricketers (1998)

Graeme Wright
 Test Decade 1972-1982 (1982)
 A Wisden Collection (2004)
 Wisden at Lord's – An Illustrated Anthology (2005)

Peter Wynne-Thomas
 Hamlyn A-Z of Cricket Records (1983)
 Give Me Arthur (1985)
 From the Weald to the World (1997)

Y
Graham Yallop
 Lambs to the Slaughter (1979)

Samuel Youd (writing as William Godfrey)
 Malleson at Melbourne (novel) (1956)
 The Friendly Game (fiction) (1957)

References

External links
 Books on the Ashes

 

Cricket